This is a list of cities in Serbia and Montenegro. For a list of municipalities, see Internal structure of Serbia and Montenegro; for a list of all places in Serbia, see List of places in Serbia; for lists of villages in Serbia and Montenegro, see List of villages in Serbia and Montenegro.

(figures after the names are from the 2002 census for Serbia and 2003 census for Montenegro, two figures designate both strictly urban as well as wider city limits, T – Town, C – muniCipality)

Serbia

Central Serbia
 Aranđelovac (T −24,336, C – 48,071)
 Bajina Bašta
 Belgrade (Urban Belgrade – 1,280,639, C – 1,574,050)
 Barajevo (T – 8,200, C – 24,436)
 Belgrade – Voždovac (T – 132,640, C – 151,746)
 Beli Potok (T – 3,507)
 Pinosava (T – 2,826)
 Belgrade – Vračar (T – 57,934)
 Grocka (T – 8,339, C – 75,376)
 Belgrade – Zvezdara (T – 132,352)
 Zemun (T – 146,172, C – 191,938)
 Surčin (T – 14,209)
 Dobanovci (T – 8,114)
 Lazarevac (T – 23,556, C – 58,474)
 Veliki Crljeni (T – 4,556)
 Rudovci (T – 1,783)
 Mladenovac (T – 22,131, C – 52,394)
 Novi Beograd – New Belgrade (T – 217,180)
 Obrenovac (T – 23,573, C – 70,974)
 Belgrade – Palilula (T – 103,702, C – 155,575)
 Borča (T – 35,001)
 Ovča (T – 2,303)
 Belgrade – Rakovica (T – 98,935)
 Belgrade – Savski Venac (T – 42,483)
 Sopot (T – 1,761, C – 20,356)
 Belgrade – Stari Grad (T – 55,541)
 Belgrade – Čukarica (T – 132,081, C – 168,356)
 Ostružnica (T – 3,929)
 Pećani (T – 489)
 Rucka (T – 306)
 Umka (T – 5,236)
 Bor
 Bosilegrad
 Bujanovac
 Čačak 
 Ćuprija
 Despotovac
 Dimitrovgrad
 Golubac
 Gornji Milanovac (T – 23,927, C – 47,588)
 Jagodina (T – 35,514, C – 70,773)
 Kragujevac (T – 193,930, C – 211,580)
 Stari Grad
 Aerodrom
 Pivara
 Stanovo
 Stragari
 Kraljevo
 Kruševac (T – 59,371, C – 131,102)
 Kuršumlija (T – 14,962, C – 21,608)
 Lazarevac
 Leskovac
 Loznica
 Medveđa
 Mladenovac
 Novi Pazar (T – 54,588, C – 85,534)
 Niš (T – 173,724, C – 250,518)
 Palilula
 Pantelej
 Medijana
 Crveni Krst
 Niška Banja
 Obrenovac
 Paraćin
 Pirot
 Požarevac
 Preševo
 Priboj (T – 19,502, C – 30,283)
 Prijepolje (T – 14,960, C – 40,971)
 Prokuplje
 Šabac 
 Sjenica
 Smederevo
 Smederevska Palanka
 Sopot
 Svilajnac (C – 36,000)
 Tutin
 Užice (T – 55,025, C – 82,852)
 Valjevo
 Veliko Gradište (T – 6,500, C – 27,000)
 Vranje
 Zaječar (T – 39,676, C – 65,837)

Vojvodina
 Ada 
 Alibunar
 Apatin
 Bač
 Bačka Palanka (T – 29,341, C – 60,938)
 Bačka Topola
 Bački Jarak
 Bački Petrovac
 Banatski Karlovac
 Bečej (T – 25,703, C – 40,877)
 Bela Crkva
 Beočin
 Crvenka
 Čoka
 Futog
 Inđija (T – 26,244, C – 49,510)
 Irig
 Jaša Tomić
 Kačarevo
 Kanjiža
 Kikinda (T – 41,825, C – 66,800)
 Kovačica
 Kovin
 Kula
 Mačvanska Mitrovica
 Mali Iđoš
 Mol 
 Nova Crnja
 Novi Bečej
 Novi Kneževac
 Novi Sad (Urban Novi Sad – 215,659, C – 298,139)
 Novi Sad proper (190,602)
 Petrovaradin (13,917)
 Sremska Kamenica (11,140)
 Odžaci
 Opovo
 Palić
 Pančevo (T – 76,400)
 Pećinci
 Plandište
 Ruma (T – 32,125, C – 59,858)
 Sečanj
 Senta
 Sombor (T – 50,950, C – 96,669)
 Srbobran
 Sremska Mitrovica
 Sremski Karlovci (T – 8,839)
 Stara Pazova
 Starčevo
 Subotica
 Šid
 Temerin
 Titel
 Vrbas (T – 25,887, C – 45,839)
 Vršac
 Zrenjanin
 Žabalj
 Žitište

Kosovo and Metohija
 Deçan
 Dragaš
 Gjakova
 Gnjilane
 Ferizaj
 Istok
 Junik
 Kačanik
 Klina
 Kosovo Polje
 Kosovska Mitrovica
 Leposavić
 Novo Brdo
 Orahovac
 Peć
 Podujevo
 Pristina
 Prizren
 Skenderaj
 Štrpce
 Vitina
 Vučitrn
 Zubin Potok
 Zvečan

Montenegro
 Andrijevica T – 1,073; C – 5,785
 Bar T – 13,719; C – 40,0337
 Berane T – 11,776; C – 35,068
 Bijelo Polje T – 15,883; C – 50,284
 Brskovo
 Budva T – 10,918; C – 15,909
 Cetinje T – 15,137; C – 18,482
 Danilovgrad T – 5,208; C – 16,523
 Gusinje T – 
 Herceg Novi T – 16,493(incl. Igalo); C – 33,034
 Kolašin T – 2,989; C – 9,949
 Kotor T – 9,500(incl. Dobrota); C – 22,947
 Mojkovac T – 4,120; C – 10,066
 Nikšić T – 58,212; C – 75,282
 Petrovac T – 1,485
 Plav T – 3,615; C – 13,805
 Pljevlja T – 21,377; C – 35,806
 Plužine T – 1,494; C – 4,272
 Podgorica T – 136,473; C – 169,132
 Rožaje T – 9,121; C – 22,693
 Sutomore T – 1,827
 Šavnik T – 570; C – 2,947
 Tivat T – 9,467; C – 13,630
 Ulcinj T – 10,828; C – 20,290
 Žabljak T – 1,937, C – 4,204

Dissolution 
Following the dissolution of the State Union of Serbia and Montenegro, Serbia and Montenegro are now separate sovereign countries. For lists of cities in these two countries, see:

List of cities in Montenegro
List of cities in Serbia

See also
 Serbia and Montenegro
 Subdivisions of Serbia and Montenegro
 List of villages in Serbia and Montenegro (disambiguation)
 Serbian cities
 List of places in Serbia	
 List of cities, towns and villages in Vojvodina
 Cities of Kosovo
 List of city listings by country
 List of cities by country

Lists of cities by country